The Warehouse Act of 1916 permitted Federal Reserve member banks to give loans to farmers on the security of their staple crops which were kept in Federal storage units as collateral.

Advocacy of 1916 Warehouse Act
United States President Woodrow Wilson proposed the Warehouse Act at a political nomination convention in Sea Girt, New Jersey on September 2, 1916:

Amendments to 1916 Act
U.S. Congressional amendments to the Warehouse Act.

See also
Combine harvester
Grain elevator
Grain Futures Act
Grain Standards Act of 1916

References

External links
 
 
 
 
 

1916 in American law
United States federal legislation